Frank Newnes Glacier is a short glacier discharging into the head of Pressure Bay on the north coast of Victoria Land, Antarctica. It was first charted by the British Antarctic Expedition, 1898–1900, which named the feature for Frank Newnes, the only son of the expedition sponsor, Sir George Newnes. The glacier lies situated on the Pennell Coast, a portion of Antarctica lying between Cape Williams and Cape Adare.

References

Glaciers of Pennell Coast